The Tunisian Challenge was a golf tournament on the Challenge Tour, held in Tunisia in 1994 and 1995. The tournament was the only leading golf event held in Tunisia between the 1985 Tunisian Open on the European Tour and the 2015 Tunisian Golf Open on the Alps Tour, aside from the Tunisian Seniors Open.

Winners

See also
Tunisian Open
Tunisian Seniors Open

References

External links
Coverage on the Challenge Tour's site

Former Challenge Tour events
Golf tournaments in Tunisia